The rufous-capped brushfinch (Atlapetes pileatus) is a species of bird in the family Passerellidae. It is endemic to Mexico.

Its natural habitats are subtropical or tropical moist montane forest and subtropical or tropical high-altitude shrubland.

References

rufous-capped brush finch
Endemic birds of Mexico
rufous-capped brush finch
Taxonomy articles created by Polbot
Birds of the Sierra Madre Occidental
Birds of the Sierra Madre Oriental
Birds of the Sierra Madre del Sur
Birds of the Trans-Mexican Volcanic Belt